Whisper That Way is the debut studio album released by 98 Degrees founding member Jeff Timmons in 2004. Every song on the album was written and arranged by Timmons. The album was released by SLG Records and is distributed by Warner Music Group in the US .

Track listing
"Favorite Star"
"Better Days"
"Whisper That Way"
"Angel Eyes"
"Rainbow"
"Can't You See"
"Thinking Of You"
"Stay With Me"
"Be The One (featuring Jim Brickman)
"That Day"
"Baby J"
"Over & Over" (bonus track)
"Better Days ("Matrix Mello" remix) (bonus track)

Singles

 Whisper That Way #23 (United States, Billboard Adult Contemporary)
 Better Days
 Favorite Star

2004 albums